Muaythai at the 2007 Asian Indoor Games was held in Macau East Asian Games Dome, Macau, China from 29 October to 3 November 2007.

Medalists

Medal table

Results

51 kg

54 kg

57 kg

60 kg

63.5 kg

67 kg

71 kg

75 kg

81 kg

References
 2007 Asian Indoor Games official website

2007 Asian Indoor Games events
2007
Indoor Games
Indoor Games